Luticola evkae is a species of non-marine diatom first found in lakes of James Ross Island.

References

Further reading
Kopalová, Kateřina, et al. "Non-marine diatoms (Bacillariophyta) from Ulu Peninsula (James Ross Island, NW Weddell Sea, Antarctica)."

External links
AlgaeBase

Naviculales